The women's trap event at the 2016 Olympic Games took place on 7 August 2016 at the National Shooting Center.

Competition format
The event consisted of two rounds: a qualifier and a final. In the qualifier, each shooter fired 3 sets of 25 targets in trap shooting, with 10 targets being thrown to the left, 10 to the right, and 5 straight-away in each set. The shooters could take two shots at each target.

The top 6 shooters in the qualifying round moved on to the semifinal round. There, they fired one round of 15 targets, where only one shot could be taken at each target. Best 2 in the semifinal round advance to gold medal match, while 3rd and 4th advance to bronze medal match. The medal match is an additional round of 15 targets.

Ties are broken using a shoot-off; additional shots are fired one at a time until there is no longer a tie.

The medals were presented by Sam Ramsamy, IOC member, South Africa and Medhat Wahdan, Honorary Member and Technical Delegates of the International Shooting Sport Federation.

Records
Prior to this competition, the existing world and Olympic records were as follows.

Qualification round

Semifinal

Final (medal matches)

References

External links

Shooting at the 2016 Summer Olympics
Olym
Women's events at the 2016 Summer Olympics